Ako Bicol Political Party (AKB) is a political party in the Philippines participating in the party-list elections in the Philippines. It represents the Bicol Region and the Bicolano people. In the 2016 elections, AKB was the top partylist with 1,664,975 votes, earning it 3 seats in Congress.

Background
AKB is a movement composed of individuals who are either residents of the Bicol Region, born of Bicolano parents, have resided in Bicol or simply interested in the promotion of the welfare and interests of the region and its people, collectively known as “Bicolanos,” with the aim to unite Bicolanos to work in the development of the Bicol Region through programs and projects that will combat poverty, provide adequate social services, promote full employment, guarantee social justice and full respect for human rights, recognize the sanctity of human life, improve delivery of health services, democratize access to education and training, protect the environment, enhance disaster preparedness and advance the participation of youth, women, gays and lesbians and physically challenged individuals as well senior citizens in nation building.

AKB also endeavors to instill confidence and foster patriotism among Bicolanos through the promotion of Bicol history, arts and culture, appreciation of the role of Bicolano heroes, national figures and other role models in the historical and cultural development of the region and strengthening the inherent resiliency of Bicolanos amidst adversities but at the same time, minimizing and if not totally eradicating, perceived attitudes and values which tend to hamper progress and development.

History

Before 2010 
AKB started as a non-government organization under the name "SOS Bicol," which provided rescue aid to residents in the Bicol region after Typhoon Reming (Durian) hit; it also sponsored livelihood programs for residents affected by the 2009 eruption of the Mayon Volcano.

2010 elections
In a May 2010 Social Weather Stations opinion poll, AKB topped the survey, with 5.64% of the vote, the equivalent of two seats, beating seasoned party-list election contenders Buhay Hayaan Yumabong and Bayan Muna. However, AKB has been accused by the Kontra Daya (Against Cheating) group of being a creation of President Gloria Macapagal Arroyo to expand her base of allies in the House of Representatives, a charge that AKB denied.

AKB emerged as the surprising topnotcher in the 2010 election, one of only two parties (the other being 1st Consumers Alliance for Rural Energy) above the threshold not to have previously sat in Congress. However, in a Bicol Mail column by Luis Ruben General, AKB would duplicate the work of the district representatives, implying that the "Bicolanos are now marginalized and distinctly disadvantaged." However, a disqualification case was filed against the party, claiming that the party had violated the party-list system law since the party was backed by the Co family, which owns construction companies, malls and resorts in Bicol, and therefore "cannot represent the marginalized and underrepresented sector," according to the disqualification petition.

On May 31, 2010, the Commission on Elections (COMELEC) declared several groups to have won seats under the party-list system, but the proclamations of AKB's seats (and those of several other parties) were deferred due to the pending disqualification cases against them. On July 28, it was announced that the COMELEC had dismissed all petitions against AKB, saying that party-list system law allows for regional political parties that do not represent a particular sector of society. The original petition was dismissed on June 29, but the original petitioners did not file a motion for reconsideration until July 26, after deadline for filing motions has lapsed. This allows the commission to proclaim Ako Bicol's three nominees as congressmen.

2013 elections
On October 10, 2012, COMELEC announced that AKB (along with 12 other parties) was disqualified from running in the 2013 party-list election by a unanimous 6–0 vote of commission members. The commission cited the party's failure to represent a specific sector of society, a requirement for parties fielding candidates under the sectoral representation (party list) system. AKB Representative Alfredo Garbin Jr. expressed surprise at the decision. On November 13, 2012, the Supreme Court granted a petition filed by AKB to forestall COMELEC acting on its decision.

2016 elections
In the 2016 elections, Ako Bicol won 1,664,975 votes (5.14% of the national vote), the highest votes for any party in the election, while winning three seats in total, making it the party's most successful election.

Death of Congressman Rodel M. Batocabe
In 2018,Rodel Batocabe announced that he would not seek re-election to the House of Representatives. Instead, Batocabe announced his candidacy for Mayor of Daraga in Albay province in the forthcoming May 2019 general elections. He would have challenged Daraga Mayor Carlwyn Baldo, who was also seeking re-election in 2019.

On December 22, 2018, Batocabe was attending a gift giving event for senior citizens in the small village of Burgos in Daraga, Albay. Two men approached Batocabe, who was 52 years-old, at the event and shot him eight times. His police escort, Officer Orlando Diaz, was also killed, while seven elderly attendees were also wounded in the attack. Batocabe and Diaz were taken to a hospital in Legazpi City, where both were pronounced dead. By coincidence, December 22 also marked Batocabe's wedding anniversary to his wife, Gertie.

On January 3, 2019, it was announced that Daraga Mayor Carlwyn Baldo had ordered the killing of Rep. Batocabe. At the time of his murder, Batocabe was running for Mayor of Daraga, while Baldo was seeking re-election. According to the police, Baldo hired six men to kill Batocabe and set up $95,000 in funds to pay for the murder. The plot had allegedly been in the works since August 2018, when Baldo supplied $4,600 to one of the hitmen to purchase guns and motorcycles. Mayor Carlwyn Baldo denied the allegations in a statement read over the phone to local radio stations, calling himself " a convenient scapegoat."

Atty. Ronald S. Ang took his oath on January 15, 2019, to replace slain lawmaker Rodel Batocabe as the representative of the party. Ang took his oath before Speaker Gloria Macapagal Arroyo and joined Christopher Co and Alfredo Garbin Jr. as representatives of the party-list in the 17th Congress.

Electoral performance

Results in the Bicol Region
AKB was the party-list with the most votes in the Bicol Region; in most regions, the party with the second-highest number of votes won with less than 10% of the vote, except in Masbate, where the Alliance of Bicolnon Party won 14.80% of the vote.

Note: Percentages in the provincial and national level are from valid votes; in the regional level, they are for all votes cast. Camarines Norte provincial results are unavailable, but they are included in the national tally.

Representatives to Congress
*Died in office

Philippine Laws Authored
AKB has authored and co-authored several Philippine laws since it was first elected in the 15th Congress up to the present-day 17th Congress.

References

Local political parties in the Philippines
Party-lists represented in the House of Representatives of the Philippines
Politics of Albay
Politics of Camarines Norte
Politics of Camarines Sur
Politics of Catanduanes
Politics of Masbate
Politics of Sorsogon
Regionalist parties in the Philippines